Hydrangea integrifolia is a species of flowering plant in the family Hydrangeaceae, native to Taiwan  and  the Philippines at elevations above 8,000 ft. (2,400 m.).

Distribution and ecology 
Hydrangea integrifolia is found scrambling along shady woodland floors, up tree trunks, and over rocky outcroppings. It grows in partially shaded areas and on coastal cliffs under salt spray.

Description 

Hydrangea integrifolia is a vine with adventitious roots that enable it to climb without assistance onto any nearby solid structure. The leaves are about 6 inches long, dark green, and glossy with a leathery texture. Their overall shape is elongated and ovate with undulating and toothed margins. Leaves are held opposite and in pairs along the stems. The petioles on newer or top growth appear bright red while others show yellow-green. Flower buds appear somewhat differently from other Hydrangeas in that they resemble over-sized golf balls prior to opening. H. integrifolia blooms open around June with terminal cymes displaying many small, white blossoms. Flowers resemble those of deciduous Hydrangeas in lace-cap form—though most often without the sterile blooms around the edges of the cyme. Spent blooms dry and are retained through the season. Fruits are dry, brown capsules.

Cultivation and uses 

Hydrangea integrifolia is primarily used as an ornamental. It is vigorous but grows slowly enough to not become invasive. It is salt tolerant and shade tolerant though full shade will reduce the amount of blooming. H. integrifolia requires regular watering, well-drained soil and sturdy supports. It can handle full sun to partial or dappled shade. H. intergrifolia may take 5 to 7 years to reach maturity and begin blooming but will bring layered texture and brightness high up in shady areas where these traits are rare. It fares best in milder climates such as USDA hardiness zones 8a to 10b. Pruning is only necessary for aesthetics and is typically limited to minor training of growth and deadheading. H. integrifolia can be propagated by cuttings and seeds.

References 

integrifolia
Flora of Taiwan
Flora of the Philippines